"Salvation" is a song by Austrian singer, songwriter and musician GuGabriel. The song was released in Austria as a digital download on July 7, 2012. The song has peaked to number 19 on the Austrian Singles Chart.

Music video
A music video to accompany the release of "Salvation" was first released onto YouTube on July 7, 2012 at a total length of three minutes and forty-nine seconds. The video was produced by Tom Hoša & Bernhard Nicolics-Jahn.

Track listing
 Digital download
 "Salvation" - 3:23

Chart performance

Release history

References

External links
 Official website
 GuGabriel on Facebook
 GuGabriel on Twitter
 GuGabriel on MySpace

2012 singles
GuGabriel songs
2011 songs